Nematabramis everetti  is a species of cyprinid endemic to Sabah. It belongs to the genus Nematabramis.

References

Fish described in 1894
Danios
Nematabramis